Meng Nan is a Chinese singer-songwriter based in Guangzhou, People's Republic of China. Meng Nan is currently signed to Universal Records and has recently released her second album. Meng Nan came to prominence after independently releasing her first album, titled 'I only have me' and after receiving an award for best new artist at a music award ceremony hosted by DongFang Television, she was soon signed to Star Max, a Chinese-based management company.

References

Year of birth missing (living people)
Living people
Singers from Heilongjiang
Chinese women singer-songwriters